Lloyd Guenther (December 14, 1906 – October 18, 1995) was an American speed skater. He competed in the men's 1500 metres event at the 1932 Winter Olympics.

References

1906 births
1995 deaths
American male speed skaters
Olympic speed skaters of the United States
Speed skaters at the 1932 Winter Olympics
Sportspeople from Detroit